Colonel Darby Bergin (September 7, 1826 – October 22, 1896) was an Ontario physician and political figure. He represented Cornwall from 1872 to 1874 and from 1878 to 1882 and then Cornwall and Stormont from 1882 to 1896 in the House of Commons of Canada as a Liberal-Conservative member. He was the 1st Canadian Surgeon General.

He was born in York (later Toronto), Upper Canada in 1826, the son of William Bergin, a York merchant who had immigrated from Ireland. He studied at Upper Canada College and McGill College, receiving his MD.CM in 1847. Bergin set up practice at Cornwall. He was founder and president of the Eastern District Medical Association, president of the St. Lawrence and Eastern District Medical Association and examiner for the College of Physicians and Surgeons of Ontario, also serving president of the council for the college from 1881 to 1882 and from 1885 to 1886. With his brother John, he also raised horses and cattle. He was defeated by Alexander Francis Macdonald, the brother of Donald Alexander Macdonald, in 1874. He opposed the Canada Temperance Act of 1878, feeling that, in the end, it increased, rather than prevented, the consumption of alcohol. Bergin also introduced private member's bills to regulate working conditions for women and children, even though it was believed by some that labour regulations fell under provincial control; his efforts led to the introduction of legislation regulating labour conditions in Ontario factories.

With Joseph Kerr, he promoted the development of the Ontario Pacific Railway, serving as president from 1886 until his death in 1896, when his brother John succeeded him. Bergin also helped promote the expansion of the Cornwall Canal. He served in the local militia during the Trent Affair and the Fenian raids, later becoming lieutenant-colonel. Bergin served as surgeon general with Middleton's expedition to the North-West in 1885. Although he was unsuccessful in persuading the government to create a permanent militia medical corps following the North-West Rebellion, the Royal Canadian Army Medical Corps was later established in 1904.

In 1896, he died in Cornwall while still in office after succumbing to an unidentified illness.

Electoral record 

On Mr. Bergin being unseated on petition, 24 December 1879:

|}

External links 
Biography at the Dictionary of Canadian Biography Online

Darby Bergin fonds, Library and Archives Canada

1826 births
1896 deaths
Conservative Party of Canada (1867–1942) MPs
Members of the House of Commons of Canada from Ontario
People of the Fenian raids
Surgeons General of Canada
People from York, Toronto
Canadian people of Irish descent